The  is a battery electric kei car marketed by Nissan and produced by NMKV. Named after the national flower of Japan, it was introduced on 20 May 2022 as the first battery electric kei car from Nissan. It is developed and manufactured alongside the Mitsubishi eK X EV, which shares the same body with the petrol-powered eK X. Its design was previewed by the IMk concept which was showcased in 2019.

Grade levels available are S, X and G and has been sold in Japan since mid-2022.

In December 2022, the Sakura alongside the Mitsubishi eK X EV was awarded as the 2022–2023 Japan Car of the Year.

References

External links 

 

Sakura
Cars introduced in 2022
Kei cars
Hatchbacks
Front-wheel-drive vehicles
Production electric cars
Electric city cars